Socket 604 is a 604-pin microprocessor socket designed to interface an Intel's Xeon processor to the rest of the computer. It provides both an electrical interface as well as physical support. This socket is designed to support a heatsink.

Launched at November 18, 2002, over the year after Socket 603, it was originally used to accommodate most Xeons introduced at the time. It was succeeded by LGA 771 in 2006 for low- and mid-end server ranges, but still staying in high-end server range, including 4- and 8-processor configurations, in which the successor - LGA 1567 - appeared in 2010. At the time, LGA 1366 was the primary socket for Xeons in low- and mid-end server ranges, with cheaper configurations still sometimes using LGA 771 socket. The socket had an unusually long life span, lasting 9 years (2 years longer than consumer-grade LGA 775) until the last processors supporting it ceased production in the 3rd quarter of 2011.

Technical specifications
Socket 604 was designed by Intel as a zero insertion force socket intended for workstations and server platforms. While the socket contains 604 pins, it only has 603 electrical contacts, the last being a dummy pin. Each contact has a 1.27mm pitch with regular pin array, to mate with a 604-pin processor package.

Socket 604 processors utilize a bus speed of either 400, 533, 667, 800, or 1066 MHz and were manufactured in either a 130, 90, 65 or 45 nm process. Socket 604 processors cannot be inserted into Socket 603 designed motherboards due to one additional pin being present, but Socket 603 processors can be inserted into Socket 604 designed motherboards, since the extra pin slot does not do anything for a 603 CPU.

Socket 604 processors range from 1.60 GHz through 3.80 GHz, with the higher clock rates only found among older, slower NetBurst-based Xeons.

The following Intel Xeon chipsets used Socket 604:
 Intel E7205
 Intel E7210 Canterwood-ES 
 Intel 7300
 Intel E7320
 Intel E7500
 Intel E7501
 Intel E7505
 Intel E7520
 Intel E7525
Late Socket 604 "revivals":
 Intel Xeon 7300 (Quadcore Core2-based "Xeon Tigerton" since September 6, 2007)
 Intel Xeon 7400 (Quad-/Hexacore Penryn-based "Xeon Dunnington" since September 15, 2008).

See also
 List of Intel microprocessors
 List of Intel Xeon microprocessors

References

External links
Intel.com

Socket 604